River of Ruin is an adventure novel by Jack Du Brul.  This is the 5th book featuring the author's primary protagonist, Philip Mercer.

2002 American novels
Novels by Jack Du Brul